This article contains a list of works by the Singaporean actress Fann Wong.

Filmography

Films

Telemovies

Dramas

Variety Shows

Music Discography

Albums

Singles

Soundtracks

Compilations

Other Songs

Video Compilations

Concerts

 2000: My Story – Fann Wong in Concert (Singapore Indoor Stadium)
 2004: Friendship Melody Music Concert (Ho Chi Minh Indoor Stadium, Vietnam)
 2006: Tonle Sap Water Festival Mega Concert (Phnom Penh, Cambodia)
 2012: 9th Asia Song Festival (Korea)

Publications
 2000: In +he Mood (Hong Kong pictorial by William Cheung Suk Ping and Wing Shya)  
 2004: Girl, Illustrated (personally-illustrated comic book)

See also
 Fann Wong

References

Wong, Fann